Barok is considered one of the most popular komiks characters in the Philippines created by Filipino cartoonist Bert Sarile in 1973. It also means Sillano. A stone-age Philippine comic book character, Barok was described by Sarile as a lead character and one of the equivalents in the Philippine comic book industry of the American cartoon characters in The Flintstones.  Barok was illustrated in komiks by Sarile as a “pre-historic caveman” who carried a “large spiked club”.

Comic book version
Barok was featured weekly in the pages of Hiwaga Komiks.  Conceived by Bert Sarile as a character of ethnic background that mirrored  the “Filipino foibles in a primitive-age setting”, Barok was the more contemporary substitute to Bondying, a postwar Filipino comic book character.  Barok was the first character in the Philippines that was created within a stone-age setting.

Film version
Later on, Barok had been featured in three Philippine films.  A 1979 version of the film starred Filipino actor and comedian Chiquito as Barok. The 1976 film is an official entry of the 1976 Metro Manila Film Festival.

Book version
Barok was one of the few Filipino comic book series or comic strips that was compiled and published in book format.  The 130-page, digest size, and black-and-white book version of Barok was published in 2004 by Pacyno Publishing, Co, Inc. and was distributed by National Book Store.

See also
Ikabod Bubwit

References

Fictional Filipino people
Philippine comics titles
Philippine comic strips
1973 comics debuts
Comics characters introduced in 1973
Fictional prehistoric characters
Comics set in prehistory
Humor comics
Male characters in comics
Philippine comics adapted into films
Filipino comics characters